Super Bowl Sunday, officially Super Sunday in the NFL, is the day on which the Super Bowl, the National Football League (NFL)'s annual championship game, is played. Sometimes described as an unofficial national holiday, it recently occurred on the first Sunday in February until Super Bowl LV in 2021; starting with Super Bowl LVI in 2022, Super Bowl Sunday is now the second Sunday in February (Sunday, February 13, 2022). Festivities for Super Sunday typically involve groups of people gathering to watch the game. Both "Super Sunday" and "Super Bowl Sunday" are registered trademarks of the National Football League. In time zones where the local time is already in Monday, such as Guam, it is known as "Super Bowl Monday".

Festivities
Although not an official holiday, Super Sunday is an occasion when many families and friends gather together to watch the game, including those who are not normally football fans. Although sports bars have historically been busy on Super Sunday in the past, it is becoming more common for people to watch the game from home. This is due in part to the increasing size of home televisions in the United States and Canada as well as the attempts of budget conscious consumers to save money.

Because watching the Super Bowl is so popular, stores are often empty of shoppers during the game, particularly in the regions represented by the two teams playing in the Super Bowl, and water usage drops, with significant rises in use during halftime and after the game, as fans use the bathroom. Additionally, churches sometimes cancel afternoon or evening services on Super Sunday, hold football-themed charity drives, or deliver sermons designed to appeal to male members of the congregation.

NFL executives have called for a three-day weekend in order to allow fans to celebrate the event, and there is thought to be a loss of productivity in the American work force on Monday after the event. The television network carrying the game (either CBS, Fox, ABC, or  NBC) will usually devote the entire day's programming schedule to the game, with extended pregame shows, NFL Films retrospectives of the previous season, and special versions of the Sunday morning talk shows in the morning and afternoon hours leading into the game. Competing networks, due to the severe loss of viewers to the Super Bowl festivities and a gentlemen's agreement not to compete against the game (most cable and broadcast networks are owned by a limited number of companies, most of which hold NFL rights), generally resort to low-cost counterprogramming measures like the Puppy Bowl.

Alternative football leagues have, especially since the Pro Bowl moved to the week before the Super Bowl, frequently begun their seasons the weekend following Super Bowl Sunday to capitalize on football fans seeking more football after the end of the NFL season. Examples include the Arena Football League from 2002 to 2006, Alliance of American Football in 2019, Fan Controlled Football in 2021, and all incarnations of the XFL to date, including 2001, 2020 and (projected) 2023.

Food

Large amounts of food and alcohol are consumed on Super Sunday. The event is the second-largest food consumption event in the United States, behind only Thanksgiving dinner, and some police departments have noticed a dramatic increase in drunk driving on Super Sunday.

Super Sunday food is usually served buffet style, rather than as a sit-down meal. Foods traditionally eaten on Super Sunday include buffalo wings, chili, baby back ribs, dipping sauces, pizza, and potato chips. Many pizza delivery businesses see their order numbers double as roughly 60 percent of the take out ordered on Super Sunday is pizza.

References

Sunday
1967 establishments in the United States
Annual events in the United States
Sunday events
January observances
Recurring events established in 1967
Unofficial observances
Eating parties
February observances